Mylothris kahusiana is a butterfly in the family Pieridae. It is found in the Democratic Republic of Congo.

References

Butterflies described in 2001
Pierini
Endemic fauna of the Democratic Republic of the Congo
Butterflies of Africa